Brachycladiidae is a family of trematodes belonging to the order Plagiorchiida.

Genera:
 Balanorchis Fischoeder, 1901
 Brachycladium Looss, 1899
 Campula Cobbold, 1858
 Cetitrema A.S.Skrjabin, 1970
 Hunterotrema Mclntosh, 1960
 Nasitrema Ozaki, 1935
 Odhneriella Skrjabin, 1915
 Orthosplanchnus Odhner, 1905
 Oschmarinella Skrjabin, 1947
 Synthesium Stunkard & Alvey, 1930
 Zalophotrema Stunkard & Alvey, 1929

References

Plagiorchiida